Goldfarb is German for golden color and is the surname of:

 Alex Goldfarb (politician), former Israeli politician
 Alexander Goldfarb (biologist), microbiologist, activist and author
 Alexander Goldfarb, an alias of NKVD agent J. Peters
 Alvin Goldfarb, president of Western Illinois University
 Aron Goldfarb, founder of G-III Apparel Group
 Charles Goldfarb, co-inventor of the Generalized Markup Language, a system for annotating text
 Donald Goldfarb (born 1941), American mathematician
 Ed Goldfarb, American composer known for Apocalypse Now Redux and the international version of the Pokémon television series
 Howard Goldfarb, Canadian poker player
 Lawrence R. Goldfarb, CEO and founding partner of LRG Capital Group
 Michael Goldfarb (author and journalist), an American foreign correspondent, author and broadcaster
 Michael Goldfarb (political writer), American conservative writer for The Weekly Standard
 Robert Goldfarb, President and CEO of Ruane, Cunniff, and Goldfarb
 Veniamin Iosifovich Goldfarb, Soviet scientist, Doctor of Technical Science, professor.
 Warren Goldfarb, philosopher and mathematician with a specialization in logic

See also 
 Broyden–Fletcher–Goldfarb–Shanno algorithm, a method for solving nonlinear optimization problems
 Goldfarb Seligman & Co., the largest law firm in Israel
 Ruane, Cunniff & Goldfarb, an investment firm in the United States

Jewish surnames
German-language surnames
Yiddish-language surnames